Loews Cineplex Entertainment, also known as Loews Incorporated, is an American theater chain operating in North America. From 1924 until 1959, it was also the parent company of Metro-Goldwyn-Mayer Studios (MGM). It was formerly jointly owned by Sony Pictures and Universal Studios and operated theatres in the United States, Canada, South Korea, Spain and Mexico.

The company was originally called "Loew's," after the founder, Marcus Loew. In 1969, when the Tisch brothers acquired the company, it became known as "Loews." The company merged with Canadian-based Cineplex Odeon Corporation in 1998, only to become bankrupt in 2001. The company merged with AMC Theatres on January 26, 2006, while the Canadian operations merged with Cineplex Galaxy in 2003.

The Loews Theatres name was used until 2017 when AMC simplified their branding to focus on three main lines: AMC, AMC Classic and AMC Dine-In after their purchase of Carmike Cinemas. Prior to the discontinuation, Loews Cineplex operated its theatres under the Loews Theatres, Cineplex Odeon, Star Theatres, Magic Johnson Theatres, Cinemex and MEGABOX brands. Its corporate offices were located in New York and Toronto.

History

Loew's Theatres Incorporated was formed in 1904 in Cincinnati, Ohio, by entrepreneur Marcus Loew. Loew founded a chain of nickelodeon theaters which showed short silent films in storefront locations. Soon the successful enterprise grew to include deluxe vaudeville houses and finally lavish movie palaces. Loew's theaters were found in cities from coast-to-coast, but primarily in East Coast and Midwest states.

To provide quality films for his theaters, Loew founded Metro-Goldwyn-Mayer (MGM) in 1924, by merging the earlier firms Metro Pictures, Goldwyn Pictures, and Louis B. Mayer Productions. Loew's Incorporated served as distribution arm and parent company for the studio until the two were forced to separate by the 1948 US Supreme Court ruling United States v. Paramount Pictures, Inc. The two companies officially split in 1959.
 
Loews Corporation, the successor company to the original firm founded by Marcus Loew, announced on April 9, 1985 that it was negotiating to sell Loews Theatres to a group headed by A. Jerrold Perenchio. Loews Corporation by this time was a holding company owned by brothers Robert and Laurence Tisch highly diversified in non-entertainment business interests ranging from hotels to insurance. Perenchio completed the acquisition for $160 million on July 11.

On October 20, 1986, when federal regulations had been relaxed, Tri-Star Pictures, then a joint venture co-owned by The Coca-Cola Company (also owners of Columbia Pictures at the time) and Time Inc.'s HBO, entered an agreement to acquire Loews Theatre Management Corporation for $300 million; Tri-Star closed the acquisition in December. HBO left Tri-Star, which merged with Columbia Pictures in 1987, resulting in the formation of Columbia Pictures Entertainment. On May 26, 1987, Tri-Star said it planned to double the 300-screen chain's size over the next year and a half through acquisitions and constructing new theaters. On January 25, 1988, Columbia agreed to acquire USA Cinemas Inc., with 325 screens, for $165 million; the acquisition was closed on March 2. Later in 1988, Loews bought 48 screens in the Washington, D.C. area from Roth Enterprises, M&R Theatres with 70 screens in the Chicago area, and JF Theatres, Inc. with 66 screens in the Baltimore area. Upon the full acquisition of Tri-Star by Columbia Pictures, and when Columbia Pictures Entertainment (now Sony Pictures Entertainment) was bought from Coca-Cola by Sony in 1989, Sony inherited the theaters. 

On April 19, 1994, Loews announced it would change its name to Sony Theatres. On April 27, Sony partnered with basketball player Magic Johnson to form Magic Johnson Theaters, a mini-chain of theaters specifically geared toward the inner cities, particularly in Los Angeles. A year before, Sony Dynamic Digital Sound was installed in several theatres, since the parent company used it to promote Sony's cinema sound division, which eventually shut down in 2002. Sony Theatres began reverting back to the Loews Theatres name in October 1996.

In September 1997, Cineplex Odeon Corporation announced that it would merge with Loews Theatres  for $1 billion, the merger was later approved by the United States Department of Justice on April 16, 1998 and was later completed that year to form Loews Cineplex Entertainment, thus making it a joint venture between Sony and Universal Studios. The combined company was one of the largest movie exhibitors in the world with theatres in the United States, Canada, Mexico, South Korea, and Spain. The company was forced to sell of its newly acquired subsidiary, Cineplex Odeon Films, to Alliance Atlantis, which was formed from the merger of Alliance Entertainment Corporation and Atlantis Communications that year. In 2001, though, the company declared Chapter 11 bankruptcy. Among the changes was the closures of 46 theatres in North America including 21 Loews theatres in the U.S. and 25 Cineplex Odeon theatres in Canada.

In 2002, Onex Corporation and Oaktree Capital Management acquired Loews Cineplex from Sony and Universal and the company was filed for initial public offering (IPO). In 2004, they sold Loews to a private group of investors which included the Carlyle Group. Onex retained the Canadian Loews Cineplex and merged it with Galaxy Cinemas to form Cineplex Galaxy Income Fund.

In 2005, AMC Theatres announced that it would merge with Loews Cineplex Entertainment and that the merged company would adopt the AMC name. At the time of the merger, Loews operated 198 theaters with 2,235 screens. Many theaters were rebranded as AMC Loews, until the Loews name was phased out in 2017.

Gallery

See also 
 Loew's Wonder Theaters
 United States v. Loew's Inc., a 1962 Supreme Court decision on block booking
 Cineplex Entertainment

References

Further reading

External links

 
Movie theatre chains in the United States
AMC Theatres
Metro-Goldwyn-Mayer
Entertainment companies based in New York City
Defunct companies based in New York City
Companies that filed for Chapter 11 bankruptcy in 2001
American companies established in 1904
Entertainment companies established in 1904
Mass media companies established in 1904
Mass media companies disestablished in 2006
1904 establishments in Ohio
2006 disestablishments in New York (state)
Companies formerly listed on the New York Stock Exchange
Former components of the Dow Jones Industrial Average
2002 initial public offerings
2006 mergers and acquisitions